Video4Linux (V4L for short) is a collection of device drivers and an API for supporting realtime video capture on Linux systems. It supports many USB webcams, TV tuners, and related devices, standardizing their output, so programmers can easily add video support to their applications.

Video4Linux is responsible for creating V4L2 device nodes aka a device file (/dev/videoX, /dev/vbiX and /dev/radioX) and tracking data from these nodes. The device node creation is handled by V4L device drivers using the video_device struct (v4l2-dev.h) and it can either be allocated dynamically or embedded in another larger struct.

Video4Linux was named after Video for Windows (which is sometimes abbreviated "V4W"), but is not technically related to it.

While Video4Linux is only available on Linux, there is a compatibility layer available for FreeBSD called Video4BSD. This provides a way for many programs that depend on V4L to also compile and run on the FreeBSD operating system.

History 
V4L had been introduced late into the 2.1.X development cycle of the Linux kernel. V4L1 support was dropped in kernel 2.6.38.

V4L2 is the second version of V4L. Video4Linux2 fixed some design bugs and started appearing in the 2.5.x kernels. Video4Linux2 drivers include a compatibility mode for Video4Linux1 applications, though the support can be incomplete and it is recommended to use Video4Linux1 devices in V4L2 mode. The project DVB-Wiki is now hosted on LinuxTV web site.

Some programs support V4L2 through the media resource locator v4l2://.

Software support 
 aMSN
 Cheese (software)
 Cinelerra
 CloudApp
 Ekiga
 FFmpeg
 FreeJ
 GStreamer
 Guvcview
 kdetv
 Kopete
 Libav
 Linphone
 LiVES
 Motion (surveillance software)
 MPlayer
 mpv
 MythTV
 Open Broadcaster Software
 OpenCV
 Peek
 PyGame
 Skype
 Tvheadend
veejay
 VLC media player
 xawtv
 Xine
 ZoneMinder

Criticism 
Video4Linux has a complex negotiation process, which caused not all applications having support for all cameras.

See also 
 Direct Rendering Manager – defines a kernel-to-user-space interface for access to graphics rendering and video acceleration
 Mesa 3D – implements video acceleration APIs

References

External links 
media_tree development git
v4l-utils development git
Linux Media Infrastructure API (V4L2, DVB and Remote Controllers)
Video4Linux-DVB wiki
 Video4Linux resources
 Video4BSD, a Video4Linux emulation layer
 Video For Linux (V4L) sample applications
 Video For Linux 2 (V4L2) sample application
 Access Video4Linux devices from Java
 kernel.org
 OpenWrt Wiki
 Linux UVC driver and tools, USB video device class (UVC)

Digital television
Free video software
Interfaces of the Linux kernel
Linux drivers
Linux kernel features
Television technology